2002 Szeged

Luca Piemonte (born 11 November 1978) is an Italian sprint canoer who has competed since the mid-2000s. He won a bronze medal in the K-4 500 m at the 2005 ICF Canoe Sprint World Championships in Zagreb.

Piemonte also finished fourth in the K-4 1000 m event at the 2008 Summer Olympics in Beijing.

References

Sports-reference.com profile

1978 births
Canoeists at the 2008 Summer Olympics
Italian male canoeists
Living people
Olympic canoeists of Italy
ICF Canoe Sprint World Championships medalists in kayak